Cannabis is illegal in Saint Pierre and Miquelon for personal use. Limited types of cannabis-derived products are permitted for medical uses. As an overseas collectivity of France, Saint Pierre and Miquelon is subject to French law and all international conventions signed by France.

See also
 Cannabis in France
 Hemp in France

References

Health in Saint Pierre and Miquelon
Saint Pierre and Miquelon
Saint Pierre and Miquelon